Xestia laetabilis is a species of moth belonging to the family Noctuidae.

It is native to Northern Europe.

References

laetabilis
Moths described in 1839